Putnam County is in north central Missouri. At the 2020 census, the population was 4,681. Its county seat is Unionville. The county was organized February 28, 1845, and named for Israel Putnam, a hero in the French and Indian War and a general in the American Revolutionary War.

Putnam County was established February 28, 1845, from parts of Adair and Sullivan counties. The following year a portion of Putnam was removed to form of Dodge County. Both Putnam and Dodge extended nearly nine miles further north until an 1851 ruling by the Supreme Court on a border dispute with Iowa assigned the contested land to Iowa. Both counties were left with less than the statutory minimum area for a county as set by the state legislature, so Dodge County was dissolved and its area added to Putnam.

In its early years, the county seat changed frequently, often with contentious debate. Putnamville, Bryant Station (both no longer in existence), and Hartford all served until a central location called Harmony, later renamed Unionville, was chosen.

In the 1860 U.S. Census Putnam County had 9,240 residents, with eighteen sawmills and three flour mills. Coal had been an abundant since its earliest settlement. Following the arrival of the Burlington & Southwestern Railway in 1873, coal mining became a major industry, especially in the east of the county. At one time three railroads crossed Putnam county: the Chicago, Milwaukee and St. Paul; the Chicago, Burlington and Quincy; and the Iowa and St. Louis. Putnam County lost over two-thirds of its population between the years 1900 and 2000 (see census data below), when the United States changed from a rural to an urban country.

Geography

Adjacent counties
Wayne County, Iowa  (northwest)
Appanoose County, Iowa  (northeast)
Schuyler County  (east)
Adair County  (southeast)
Sullivan County  (south)
Mercer County  (west)

Major highways
 U.S. Route 136
 Route 5
 Route 129
 Route 139
 Route 149

Demographics

As of the census of 2010, there were 4,979 people, 2,228 households, and 1,517 families residing in the county. The population density was 10 people per square mile (4/km2). There were 2,914 housing units at an average density of 6 per square mile (2/km2). The racial makeup of the county was 99.14% White, 0.06% Black or African American, 0.10% Native American, 0.13% Asian, 0.10% from other races, and 0.48% from two or more races. Approximately 0.61% of the population were Hispanic or Latino of any race.

There were 2,228 households, out of which 27.90% had children under the age of 18 living with them, 57.20% were married couples living together, 7.20% had a female householder with no husband present, and 31.90% were non-families. 28.70% of all households were made up of individuals, and 15.90% had someone living alone who was 65 years of age or older. The average household size was 2.32 and the average family size was 2.83.

In the county, the population was spread out, with 24.00% under the age of 18, 6.20% from 18 to 24, 24.00% from 25 to 44, 25.10% from 45 to 64, and 20.70% who were 65 years of age or older. The median age was 42 years. For every 100 females there were 96.10 males. For every 100 females age 18 and over, there were 91.90 males.

The median income for a household in the county was $26,282, and the median income for a family was $32,031. Males had a median income of $22,957 versus $18,884 for females. The per capita income for the county was $14,647. About 13.20% of families and 16.00% of the population were below the poverty line, including 20.60% of those under age 18 and 12.80% of those age 65 or over.
 Pre-1900 data from A History of Northeast Missouri, Published 1913

2020 Census

Education

Public schools
Putnam County Elementary School (PK-05)
Putnam County Middle School (06-08)
Putnam County High School (09-12)

Public libraries
Putnam County Public Library

Politics

Local
The Republican Party predominantly controls politics at the local level in Putnam County. Republicans hold all but one of the elected positions in the county.

State

All of Putnam County is a part of Missouri's 3rd District in the Missouri House of Representatives and is represented by Nate Walker (R-Kirksville).

All of Putnam County is a part of Missouri's 12th District in the Missouri Senate and is currently represented by Dan Hegeman (R-Cosby).

Federal

All of Putnam County is included in Missouri's 6th Congressional District and is currently represented by Sam Graves (R-Tarkio) in the U.S. House of Representatives.

Communities

City
Unionville (county seat)

Villages
Livonia
Lucerne
Powersville
Worthington

Census-designated place
Lemons

Unincorporated communities

Chapel
Chariton
Elko
Esper
Galesburg
Glendale
Graysville
Hartford
Martinstown
Omaha
Quinn
Rosewood
St. John
Sidney
Wyreka

See also
National Register of Historic Places listings in Putnam County, Missouri

References

External links
 Digitized 1930 Plat Book of Putnam County  from University of Missouri Division of Special Collections, Archives, and Rare Books

 
1845 establishments in Missouri
Populated places established in 1845